Scientology Finance are the policies employed in Church of Scientology organizations related to financial management, the purpose of which is defined by L. Ron Hubbard in HCOPL 1 May 1958 Issue II, titled "Financial Management": "Purpose: Makes certain the org makes money and continues in good credit."

Policy on bill payment and creditors

From HCOPL 28 January 1965 "How to Maintain Credit Standing and Solvency" on page 5, Hubbard states:
"Only pay by this system: PAY EVERYTHING UP TO A DATE ALWAYS and no further."

Hubbard states in this policy that collection actions by creditors accompanied by threat are only paid when threats are made in the future: "Government tax bills, water bills, occasionally rent or phone are sometimes accompanied by threats of vast action unless the whole bill is paid instantly. Still try to use the above system. But if you can't, pay it and retard other bills accordingly. And thereafter, don't pay that outfit's bill on any other terms than threatened trouble."

In situations of dealing with a contractor, Hubbard gives special advice: "If a tradesman, despite the use of the above system, demands further payment or threatens suit, caution him that if he carries on this way you'll deal elsewhere. And carry out the threat. Never continue to use a private business firm after they become obnoxious about bills. Trade elsewhere. And say why."

Hubbard asserts that if a creditor gets upset with non-payment by a Scientology organization, then the creditor is "gypping" the organization or is unwilling to do financing: "If you're using the above dateline system and a tradesman gets upset, then he is gypping you or he has too little finance to handle your account, so stop trading with him. Always make that an ironbound policy. Be very proud and haughty about bills. Never propitiate."

Use of this policy has resulted in lawsuits brought against Scientology organizations for non-payment of bills.

Policy on payment for Scientology services
In contrast to Hubbard's policy on creditors, his policy on payment for services mandates prepayment. From HCOPL 27 November 1971 Issue III, "FREE SERVICES = FREE FALL" (all text in this policy letter is in capital letters):
"An Auditor or Course Supervisor delivering a service to an individual without having to hand a fully paid invoice for that service and who does not send the person back to the registrar to be signed up for that service is: A. Covertly robbing his fellow staff members of their pay, and B. In a condition of Treason to his org, and is so assigned."

References

Notes

External links
 Church Markets its Gospel with High-pressure Sales
 Scientology:Religion or Racket?
 Scientology and Payment of Bills

Scientology beliefs and practices